Alonzo Henderson (born 22 December 1955) is an Irish judoka. He competed in the men's lightweight event at the 1980 Summer Olympics.

References

1955 births
Living people
Irish male judoka
Olympic judoka of Ireland
Judoka at the 1980 Summer Olympics
Place of birth missing (living people)
20th-century Irish people